Pine Hill is a historic mansion in Ashwood, Tennessee, U.S.. It was built in 1839 for Samuel Henry Armstrong, a wheat, corn and tobacco farmer. It was purchased by the Dixon family in 1869.

The house was designed in the Federal architectural style, with a Greek Revival portico. It has been listed on the National Register of Historic Places since December 15, 1983.

References

National Register of Historic Places in Maury County, Tennessee
Federal architecture in Tennessee
Houses completed in 1839